Renell Wren (born October 23, 1995) is an American football defensive end for the Pittsburgh Steelers of the National Football League (NFL). He played college football at Arizona State and was drafted by the Cincinnati Bengals in the fourth round of the 2019 NFL Draft.

Professional career

Cincinnati Bengals
Wren was drafted by the Cincinnati Bengals in the fourth round, 125th overall, of the 2019 NFL Draft. He played in 11 games with two starts before being placed on injured reserve on December 14, 2019.

Wren was placed on the active/non-football injury list at the start of training camp on August 3, 2020. He was moved back to the active roster on August 13. He was placed on injured reserve with a quadriceps injury on August 23, 2020.

On August 31, 2021, Wren was waived by the Bengals and re-signed to the practice squad the next day.

Philadelphia Eagles
On February 25, 2022, Wren signed with the Philadelphia Eagles. He was released on August 30.

Pittsburgh Steelers
On September 2, 2022, Wren signed to the Pittsburgh Steelers practice squad. He signed a reserve/future contract on January 12, 2023.

References

External links
Pittsburgh Steelers bio
Arizona State Sun Devils bio

1995 births
Living people
Players of American football from St. Louis
African-American players of American football
African-American Christians
American Christians
American football defensive tackles
Arizona State Sun Devils football players
Cincinnati Bengals players
21st-century African-American sportspeople
Philadelphia Eagles players
Pittsburgh Steelers players